The 1999 SMU Mustangs football team represented Southern Methodist University (SMU) as a member the Western Athletic Conference (WAC) during the 1999 NCAA Division I-A football season. Led by third-year head coach Mike Cavan, the Mustangs compiled an overall record of 4–6 with a mark of 3–3 in conference play, placing fifth in the WAC.

Schedule

Roster

References

SMU
SMU Mustangs football seasons
SMU Mustangs football